Lissocarcinus is a genus of crabs containing the following nine species :
Lissocarcinus arkati Kemp, 1923
Lissocarcinus boholensis Semper, 1880
Lissocarcinus echinodisci Derijard, 1968
Lissocarcinus elegans Boone, 1934
Lissocarcinus holothuricola (Streets, 1877)
Lissocarcinus laevis Miers, 1886
Lissocarcinus orbicularis Dana, 1852
Lissocarcinus ornatus Chopra, 1931
Lissocarcinus polybioides Adams & White, 1849

References

Portunoidea